The 1997 Tonga rugby union tour of Great Britain was a series of matches played in October and November 1997 in Scotland, Wales and England Great Britain by Tonga national rugby union team.

Results 
Scores and results list Tonga's points tally first.

References 

1997 rugby union tours
1997
1997 in Oceanian rugby union
1997–98 in British rugby union
1997–98 in English rugby union
1997–98 in Scottish rugby union
1997–98 in Welsh rugby union
1997
1997
1997
Rugby union